Madison Parish (French: Paroisse de Madison) is a parish located on the northeastern border of the U.S. state of Louisiana, in the delta lowlands along the Mississippi River. As of the 2020 census, the population was 10,017. Its parish seat is Tallulah. The parish was formed in 1839.

With a history of cotton plantations and pecan farms, the parish economy continues to be primarily agricultural. It has a majority African-American population. For years a ferry connected Delta, Louisiana (and traffic from the parish) to Vicksburg, Mississippi. The Vicksburg Bridge now carries U.S. Route 80 and Interstate 20 across the river into Madison Parish.

History

Prehistory

Madison Parish was the home to many succeeding Native American groups in the thousands of years before European settlement. Peoples of the Marksville culture, Troyville culture, Coles Creek culture and Plaquemine culture built villages and earthwork mound complexes throughout the area. Notable examples include the Fitzhugh Mounds and the Raffman site.

Historic tribes which were encountered by European colonists include the Taensa and Natchez peoples, who both spoke the Natchez language.

European settlement to present

The parish is named for former U.S. President James Madison. As was typical of northern areas of Louisiana, and especially along the Mississippi River, it was developed for cotton agriculture on large plantations worked by large groups of enslaved African Americans.

Following the Reconstruction era and during the Jim Crow era, white Democrats across the state violently suppressed black voting, which was for Republican candidates, and civil rights. Twelve blacks were lynched in Madison Parish from 1877 to 1950, most near the turn of the 20th century when social and economic tensions were the highest. In addition, in July 1899 five immigrant Sicilian grocers were lynched by whites in Tallulah, the parish seat, for failing to observe Jim Crow customs of serving whites before blacks and because they were competing with locals with their stores.

Civil rights legislation in 1965 enabled more African Americans to exercise their constitutional rights to register and vote in Madison Parish, and they began to elect candidates of their choice to local offices. In 1969 Zelma Wyche was elected as Police Chief of Tallulah. In 1974 Adell Williams was elected as mayor, the first African American to fill this position.

Geography

Major highways
  Interstate 20
  U.S. Highway 65
  U.S. Highway 80

Adjacent counties and parishes
 East Carroll Parish  (north)
 Warren County, Mississippi  (east)
 Tensas Parish  (south)
 Franklin Parish  (southwest)
 Richland Parish  (northwest)

National protected areas
 Tensas River National Wildlife Refuge (part)
 Vicksburg National Military Park (part)

Demographics
Because of limited job opportunities as agriculture has mechanized and the Chicago Lumber Mill closed, the parish population has declined overall by about one-third since its peak in 1980. Numerous African Americans left during the first half of the 20th century in the Great Migration to escape the violence and oppression of Jim Crow; they moved to the North and West.

2020

As of the 2020 United States census, there were 10,017 people, 3,832 households, and 2,443 families residing in the parish.

2010
According to the 2010 U.S. Census, the racial makeup was:
 61.0% Black
 37.2% White
 1.6% Hispanic or Latino (of any race)
 0.2% Native American
 0.2% Asian
 0.0% Native Hawaiian or Pacific Islander
 0.4% Some other race
 0.9% Two or more races

2000
As of the census of 2000, there were 13,728 people, 4,469 households, and 3,141 families residing in the parish.  The population density was 22 people per square mile (8/km2).  There were 4,979 housing units at an average density of 8 per square mile (3/km2).  The racial makeup of the parish was 60.34% Black or African American, 37.86% White, 0.15% Native American, 0.16% Asian, 0.01% Pacific Islander, 0.35% from other races, and 1.13% from two or more races.  2.10% of the population were Hispanic or Latino of any race.

There were 4,469 households, out of which 35.40% had children under the age of 18 living with them, 41.20% were married couples living together, 24.20% had a female householder with no husband present, and 29.70% were non-families. 26.60% of all households were made up of individuals, and 11.00% had someone living alone who was 65 years of age or older.  The average household size was 2.74 and the average family size was 3.35.

In the parish the population was spread out, with 32.60% under the age of 18, 11.20% from 18 to 24, 25.50% from 25 to 44, 19.10% from 45 to 64, and 11.60% who were 65 years of age or older.  The median age was 30 years. For every 100 females there were 103.30 males.  For every 100 females age 18 and over, there were 95.60 males.

The median income for a household in the parish was $20,509, and the median income for a family was $23,589. Males had a median income of $26,394 versus $16,141 for females. The per capita income for the parish was $10,114.  About 29.70% of families and 36.70% of the population were below the poverty line, including 51.60% of those under age 18 and 22.00% of those age 65 or over. The parish's per-capita income makes it one of the poorest places in the United States.

Politics
With its majority-black population, Madison Parish in the 21st century has become a stronghold of support for the Democratic Party. Prior to the passage of the Voting Rights Act of 1965, when the state unconstitutionally prevented blacks from voting, the white Madison Parish voters in 1962 supported the Republican nominee Taylor W. O'Hearn for the US Senate; he lost to powerful Democratic incumbent Russell B. Long. O'Hearn polled 58.7 percent among whites in Madison Parish. He later was elected to the Louisiana House of Representatives from Caddo Parish, also in the northern part of the state.

During the 1970s and 1980s, conservative white voters in Louisiana and other southern states began to shift to supporting Republican presidential candidates, creating a more competitive system than the Solid South. Since the civil rights era, most African Americans in the South have supported Democratic candidates, as the national party supported their drive to exercise constitutional rights as citizens, even though most Southern Democrats remained vehemently opposed to civil rights. In 1988, Governor Michael Dukakis of Massachusetts won in Madison Parish, with 2,416 votes (49.2 percent) compared to Republican Vice President George H. W. Bush, who finished in the presidential contest with 2,334 ballots (47.5 percent).

In 2008, the Democrat Barack Obama of Illinois received 3,100 votes (58.5 percent) in Madison Parish to 2,152 (40.6 percent) for the Republican U.S. Senator John McCain of Arizona. In 2012, Madison Parish gave President Obama 3,154 votes (60.8 percent) to Mitt Romney's 2,000 ballots (38.6 percent), 152 fewer votes than McCain had received four years earlier.

Education
Public schools in Madison Parish are operated by the Madison Parish School Board.

Corrections

The private Lasalle Management firm operates the Madison Parish Correctional Center and Louisiana Correction Transitional Center for Women (CTCW), both located in Tallulah.

Communities

Cities 
 Tallulah (parish seat and largest municipality)

Villages 
 Delta
 Mound
 Richmond

Notable people
 Buddy Caldwell
 Zelma Wyche

References

External links
 Madison Parish Sheriff's  Office
 Official website of Madison Parish
 National Register of Historic Places listings in Madison Parish, Louisiana

 
Louisiana parishes
Louisiana parishes on the Mississippi River
1839 establishments in Louisiana
Populated places established in 1839
Black Belt (U.S. region)
Majority-minority parishes in Louisiana